Kalveliai is a village in Vilnius District Municipality, Lithuania, it is located only about  east of Vilnius city municipality. According to the 2021 census, it had population of 1502, a decrease from 1592, counted by 2011 census and a 26% decrease from 2021 inhabitants, counted by the 1989 census.

References

Villages in Vilnius County
Vilnius District Municipality